Buzz Factory is the fourth studio album by Seattle based band the Screaming Trees, released in the spring of 1989. It was their final record for SST Records before they moved on to their major label debut. The LP itself was available on translucent purple vinyl. While touring to support the album, SST had informed that band multiple times that their album would shortly be released. However, this failed to materialize until the last day of the tour, after which they elected to leave SST. Their next recording, the Change Has Come EP, was released in December 1989 on Sub Pop Records.

Track listing

Personnel
Screaming Trees
 Mark Lanegan – lead vocals
 Gary Lee Conner – guitar, backing vocals 
 Van Conner – bass, backing vocals
 Mark Pickerel – drums

Additional
 Rod Doak – studio technician
 Dana Doak – studio technician 
 Jack Endino – producer, backing vocals on 'Black Sun Morning'
 Jena Scott – cover design

References

Screaming Trees albums
1988 albums
SST Records albums
Albums produced by Jack Endino